Lenhartsville is a borough in Berks County, Pennsylvania. The population was 165 at the 2010 census.

Geography
Lenhartsville is located in northern Berks County at  (40.573438, -75.886717), in the valley of Maiden Creek. It is surrounded by Greenwich Township but is separate from it.

History
Heinrich (Henry) Lenhart, 1773–1837, son of Jacob Lenhart, is considered the founder of Lenhartsville, on land once owned by his grandfather Johan Peter Lenhart.

The Lenhart Farm was listed on the National Register of Historic Places in 1978.

Demographics

At the 2000 census, there were 173 people, 78 households, and 47 families living in the borough. The population density was 1,296.6 people per square mile (513.8/km2). There were 82 housing units at an average density of 614.6 per square mile (243.5/km2).  The racial makeup of the borough was 100.00% White. Hispanic or Latino of any race were 0.58%. Historically there is a large Pennsylvania Dutch population.

There were 78 households, 23.1% had children under the age of 18 living with them, 53.8% were married couples living together, 7.7% had a female householder with no husband present, and 38.5% were non-families. 28.2% of households were made up of individuals, and 14.1% were one person aged 65 or older. The average household size was 2.22 and the average family size was 2.73.

The age distribution was 17.3% under the age of 18, 8.7% from 18 to 24, 31.2% from 25 to 44, 26.0% from 45 to 64, and 16.8% 65 or older. The median age was 37 years. For every 100 females there were 96.6 males. For every 100 females age 18 and over, there were 93.2 males.

The median household income was $36,071 and the median family income  was $36,964. Males had a median income of $35,000 versus $20,500 for females. The per capita income for the borough was $16,998. About 9.4% of families and 9.8% of the population were below the poverty line, including 7.1% of those under the age of eighteen and 8.3% of those sixty five or over.

Transportation

Pennsylvania Route 143 is the only state highway serving Lenhartsville. It follows a southeast-to-northwest alignment through the borough via Chestnut Street and Willow Street. From Lenhartsville, PA 143 leads south  via Pennsylvania Route 662 to U.S. Route 222 between Kutztown and Reading, and northeast  to New Tripoli.

The Interstate 78/U.S. Route 22 freeway passes just north of the borough, with access to Lenhartsville via Exit 35. I-78/US 22 leads east  to Allentown and west  to Harrisburg.

References

External links

1854 establishments in Pennsylvania
Boroughs in Berks County, Pennsylvania
Populated places established in 1854